Hiwaga sa Bahay na Bato is a Philippine television of soap opera on primetime drama on ABS-CBN channel 3, written by Jose Miranda Cruz. It aired from September 30, 1963. The program is considered to be one of the first television-produced drama serials in the Philippines. This show concluded on January 25, 1964.

Cast
 Dalton de Castro as Sonia
 Flora Cristobal as Tiya Berta
 Eva Darren as Linda
 Teddy Santos as Rommel
 Noel Nolasco as Froilan
 Lita Delos Reyes as Onay
 Estela Grande as Alona
 Baby Bernardo as Candice
 Ernesto Fajardo as Alfred
 Lina Chico as Gloria
 Ben David as Rowell

References

1963 Philippine television series debuts
1964 Philippine television series endings
ABS-CBN drama series
Filipino-language television shows
Television shows set in the Philippines